Zamia onan-reyesii is a species of cycad in the family Zamiaceae endemic to Cortés Department, northern Honduras.

References

Whitelock, Loran M. 2002. The Cycads. Portland: Timber Press.

External links
 

onan-reyesii